This article is the discography of British band The Spencer Davis Group.

Albums 
The Spencer Davis Group's first three studio albums weren't released in the US and Canada. Instead, the first two albums released there were Gimme Some Lovin''' and I'm a Man'' in 1967, both of which compiled tracks from the three studio albums.

Studio albums

Live albums

Soundtrack albums

Compilation albums

EPs

Singles

Videos

Video albums

Notes

References 

Discographies of British artists
Rock music group discographies
Rhythm and blues discographies